The 2010 Six Nations Under 20s Championship was a rugby union competition held between February and March 2010. Ireland won the tournament and the Triple Crown but no team won the Grand Slam.

Final table

Results

Round one

Round two

Round three

Round four

Round five

Top try-scorers
Hudson, Conway (both IRE), Fish	(WAL) – 4 tries

Spence	(IRE), Phillips, Loxton	(both WAL) – 3 tries

Marler, May, Watson (all ENG), Bales, Dupont (both FRA), Brown (SCO) – 2 tries

References

2010
2010 rugby union tournaments for national teams
2009–10 in English rugby union
2009–10 in French rugby union
2009–10 in Irish rugby union
2009–10 in Welsh rugby union
2009–10 in Scottish rugby union
2009–10 in Italian rugby union
U-20
February 2010 sports events in Europe
March 2010 sports events in Europe